Ab Bid-e Deli Rich-e Olya (also Romanized as Āb Bīd-e Delī Rīch-e ‘Olyā; also known as Āb Bīd) is a village in Margown Rural District, Margown District, Boyer-Ahmad County, Kohgiluyeh and Boyer-Ahmad Province, Iran. At the 2006 census, its population was 96, in 19 families.

References 

Populated places in Boyer-Ahmad County